Modebadze is a Georgian surname. Notable people with the surname include:

Alex Modebadze (born 1978), Georgian freestyle wrestler
Irakli Modebadze (born 1984), Georgian footballer
Mirian Modebadze (born 1997), Georgian rugby union player

Georgian-language surnames
Surnames of Georgian origin